Stockholm dialects are the forms of Swedish spoken in Stockholm. An exact definition encompassing its peculiarities is hard to find, as a cosmopolitan culture and early adoption infers a great variety of international influences that are then spread to the rest of Sweden, and, as Stockholm is a highly urbanized area, the dialects of Stockholm are more likely to undergo rapid changes than dialects spoken in rural areas.

Some word endings are typical of Stockholm dialects. When windmills were used they were given female names ending in -an. For instance a windmill owned by a Dutchman would be called  ("Dutchwoman"). The -an ending was later adopted for other places.

Another ending is -is from Latin although in practice it is used roughly as a diminutive or to add familiarity.

References

Culture in Stockholm
Swedish dialects